We Too Walked on the Moon is a 2009 film directed by Balufu Bakupa-Kanyinda.

Synopsis 
The movie is set in 1969 in Kinshasa, Congo, amid the American moon landings on July 21 of that year. Husband and wife couple Tanga and Nika wait for Sister Mwezi to spend a "Moon" evening with Nika's brother Muntu-wa-Bantu. However, the nun does not appear. The Moon is full. Muntu-wa-Bantu holds the transistor radio up to his ear as he stares at the Moon. He wants to see the first steps of mankind on the Moon for himself, but cannot reconcile the radio commentary with what he sees. Questioning the Moon's distance from the Earth, Muntu-wa-Bantu decides that he too will walk on the Moon.

External links 

 

2009 films
Algerian drama films
Democratic Republic of the Congo drama films
Creative Commons-licensed films